"The Age of Reason" is the sixth episode of the second season of the HBO television series Boardwalk Empire, and 18th episode overall.  Originally aired on October 30, 2011, it was written by staff writer Bathsheba Doran and directed by Jeremy Podeswa.

Plot 
Van Alden visits his colleague, who is badly burned. He talks to Van Alden and says 'I know what you did'. A distraught Van Alden calls his wife, saying he has sinned but will account for it. Later, Van Alden prepares to confess to his boss, when it is discovered that his delirious colleague has been saying the same thing to everyone he sees, and will die soon. 
Alone in her apartment, Lucy gives birth to a girl. Van Alden arrives to find his wife Rose caring for Lucy. After receiving the call, Rose came to Atlantic City to help him, only to find Lucy. Van Alden claims that he did it for her, saying they will take the child. Rose storms off.

Teddy is to have his first confession. His priest says that as his mother, Margaret, also needs to confess. She confesses to having sexual feelings for Sleater.

The case against Nucky is taken over by federal prosecution. However, Attorney-General Daugherty is being coerced by Senator Edge into taking Nucky down. Daugherty shares this information with Nucky.

Jimmy ambushes one of Nucky's alcohol deliveries, only to find that Luciano is heading the delivery. Luciano and Jimmy come to an arrangement: complete the delivery as planned, then meet to discuss the heroin trade.

Title
In canon law of the Roman Catholic Church, the age of reason is the age at which children are considered capable of moral responsibility, and of understanding and participating in the sacraments; usually around seven or eight years old.  In the episode, Father Brennan explains this to Teddy in preparation for his first confession.

Reception

Critical reception 
IGN gave the episode a score of 8 out of 10.

Ratings 
The episode was watched by 2.629 million viewers, and fell a tenth to a 1.0 for adults in the 18-49 rating.

References

External links 
  "The Age of Reason" at HBO.com
 
 "The Age of Reason" review by Noel Murray (30 October 2011) for The A.V. Club
 "The Age of Reason" review by Teresa Lopez (30 October 2011) for TV Fanatic
 Review: Boardwalk Empire—"The Age of Reason": When life gives you lemons... by Alan Sepinwall (30 October 2011) for HitFix
 "The Age of Reason" review by Sean Gandert (31 October 2011) for Paste
 "The Age of Reason" review by Joe R for Television Without Pity

2011 American television episodes
Boardwalk Empire episodes
Television episodes directed by Jeremy Podeswa